Izadshahr; formerly, Iz Deh (Persian: ایز ده), also Romanized as ‘Īz Deh, Īzdeh, Izedeh, and Iz-e-Deh; also known as Īzdeh-e Bāzārsar) is a city in the Central District of Nur County, located on the Caspian Sea in Mazandaran Province of northern Iran.

At the 2006 census, its population was 6,882, with 1,923 families.

References

External links

Cities in Mazandaran Province
Populated places in Nur County
Populated coastal places in Iran
Populated places on the Caspian Sea